Colin Wark (1896 – 1939) was a British composer of film scores, theatre music and light music. Many of the films he scored were "quota quickies", mostly low-cost, low-quality, quickly-accomplished films commissioned by American distributors active in the UK or by British cinema owners purely to satisfy the quota requirements.

Wark was also the composer of the score for Tulip Time, a comedy with music based on the play The Strange Adventures of Miss Brown by Robert Buchanan (1841-1901) and Charles Marlowe. Tulip Time opened at the Alhambra Theatre in London on August 14, 1935 and ran for 425 performances.

In 1932 he was responsible for launching and managing Pasquale Troise and his Mandoliers, an orchestra of about 16 mandolin, accordion, guitar and tuned percussion players that made a series of BBC broadcasts between 1932 and 1933.

Light music compositions include the novelty intermezzo Animal Antics, Bouncing Ball (xylophone or piccolo solo), and Chrysanthemums for orchestra and piano. Philip L Scowcroft has suggested that Wark used the pseudonym Michele Lesley for some compositions, such as Waltz Serene.

Selected filmography

References

External links

 Animal Antics, played by the London Palladium Orchestra
 Tulip Time entry, Robert Williams Buchanan website

Musicians from London
1896 births
1939 deaths
20th-century British composers
English film score composers
English male film score composers
20th-century British male musicians